Margaret Dorothy Baker (6 June 1907 - 2003) was a British artist.

She was born in Sydenham, South London, on 6 June 1907. She was awarded a scholarship in 1925 to Royal College of Art where she was under the tutelage of William Rothenstein and Randolph Schwabe. In school she submitted her work to the New English Art Club for the Prix de Rome. After school, 1929, she taught art at girls schools near Birmingham until she married Kenneth Pringle, a dental surgeon, in 1938. They lived in central London until the blitz.  Margaret and her son escaped to the Devon Coast from the bombing to return after the war. Barker mostly produced landscapes but also painted friends and imaginative portraits. After their son died in the 1960s Barker and her husband moved to North Kent where Margaret's painting trailed off only producing a few watercolor landscapes. Kenneth Pringle died March 1983 returning Margaret to Sydenham.

Her work is in the permanent collection of the Tate Gallery.

References

1907 births
2003 deaths
People from Sydenham, London
20th-century English painters